Seka Severin de Tudja (Zagreb, Croatia (then Yugoslavia) 1923, Caracas, Venezuela 2007) was a Venezuelan ceramicist known as Seka.

Education 
Seka studied sculpture at the Academy of Fine Arts in Zagreb with Frano Krsinic and Krsto Hegedusic (1942–45), before moving to Paris on a scholarship from the French government from 1946 until 1948. There, she continued her studies in sculpture as well as drawing at the Académie de la Grande Chaumière, before earning a degree from the Sorbonne (1948) in art history and archaeology.

Career 
While in Paris, Seka experimented with materials and processes and made animations with wax-sculpted figurines; her work in a ceramic button workshop led to a more technical understanding of the medium. In 1952, she moved to Caracas, where she continued making utilitarian objects, while testing variations in heat and firing times in her newly acquired large kiln. Her work at this time remained varied, however, she presented a ceramic bas-relief mural at the 1955 XVI Salón Oficial Annual de Arte Venezolano (Official Annual Venezuelan Art Salon), the latter earning the National Prize for Applied Arts. She was also awarded with gold medals at the Exposition Internationale, les émaux dans la céramique actuelle (International Exhibition: Current Ceramic Enamels) at the Musée Ariana (The Swiss Museum of Ceramics and Glass) in Geneva (1965) and the exhibition Form und Qualität (Form and Quality) in Munich, Germany (1967); as well as distinguished with diplomas in the International Exhibition of Ceramics at the Victoria and Albert Museum in London (1972) and the World Triennial of Fine Ceramics in Zagreb, Yugoslavia (1984). Her first solo exhibition Treinta y cinco cerámicas de Seka (Thirty-Five Ceramics by Seka) was organized by Miguel Arroyo in 1962 at the Museo de Bellas Artes (Caracas). From this moment, Seka began to garner international attention and represented Venezuela in exhibitions abroad. This show was followed by two major retrospective in Caracas at the Museo de Arte Contemporáneo (1982) and at the Centro Cultural Consulado (1993). Seka's work was shown internationally in numerous group exhibitions staged during her lifetime.

Artwork 
Her early Venezuelan works incorporate pre-Columbian-inspired figures, whereas later works rejected ornamentation in favor of featuring process, medium, and concerns of form, texture, and color. After 1972, Seka explored the possibilities of ovoid forms with a completely solid exterior, further bridging the divide between ceramics and sculpture.

Exhibitions 
 Treinta y cinco cerámicas de Seka (Thirty-Five Ceramics by Seka), Museo de Bellas Artes (Caracas),1962. Solo exhibition.
 Exposition Internationale, les émaux dans la céramique actuelle (International Exhibition: Current Ceramic Enamels), Musée Ariana (The Swiss Museum of Ceramics and Glass) (Geneva), 1965.
 Form und Qualität (Form and Quality) (Munich), 1967.
 International Exhibition of Ceramics, Victoria and Albert Museum (London), 1972. World Triennial of Fine Ceramics (Zagreb), 1984. 
 Museo de Arte Contemporáneo (Caracas), 1982. 
 Centro Cultural Consulado (Caracas), 1993.
 Moderno: Design for Living in Brazil, Mexico, and Venezuela, Americas Society (New York), 2015.

References 
 Barbieri, Nelly. ''El movimiento cerámico en Venezuela. Caracas: CONAC, 1998.
 Diccionario biográfico de las artes visuales en Venezuela. Caracas: Fundación Galería de Arte Nacional, 2005.
 La cerámica de Seka, 1960-1993''. Exh. Cat. Caracas: Centro Cultural Consolidado, 1993.

1923 births
2007 deaths
20th-century women artists
Academy of Fine Arts, University of Zagreb alumni
Alumni of the Académie de la Grande Chaumière
Yugoslav emigrants to Venezuela
Artists from Zagreb
University of Paris alumni
Venezuelan women ceramists
Venezuelan ceramists
20th-century ceramists
Yugoslav expatriates in France